Krasnosyolovka is a rural locality (a selo) and the administrative center of Krasnosyolovskoye Rural Settlement, Petropavlovsky District, Voronezh Oblast, Russia. The population was 1,502 as of 2010. There are 23 streets.

Geography 
Krasnosyolovka is located 11 km north of Petropavlovka (the district's administrative centre) by road. Indychy is the nearest rural locality.

References 

Rural localities in Petropavlovsky District, Voronezh Oblast